Jorge Amparo (born 4 March 1954) is a Dominican Republic boxer. He competed in the men's light middleweight event at the 1976 Summer Olympics.

References

External links

1954 births
Living people
Dominican Republic male boxers
Olympic boxers of the Dominican Republic
Boxers at the 1976 Summer Olympics
Boxers at the 1979 Pan American Games
Boxers at the 1983 Pan American Games
Pan American Games bronze medalists for the Dominican Republic
Pan American Games medalists in boxing
Light-middleweight boxers
Medalists at the 1979 Pan American Games
20th-century Dominican Republic people
21st-century Dominican Republic people